Permatang Pasir (Mukim 3) is a small village in Central Seberang Perai District, Penang, Malaysia. This village is located near Permatang Pauh.

See also
Permatang Pasir by-election, 2009

Central Seberang Perai District
Villages in Penang